Višnjan is a village and municipality in Istria, Croatia. Višnjan is the site of Višnjan Observatory (an astronomical observatory). The observatory is home of several long-running international summer programs for youth in astronomy, archeology, marine biology and other disciplines.

Geography

Višnjan is located 12 kilometers east of Poreč and 3 kilometers west of Pula-Koper road. Višnjan is located on elevation of 244m and average municipality elevation is between 200-300m. One of the most notable sinkholes in Istria, Baredina, is located in the municipality.

Demographics

According to the 2001 census Višnjan had a population of 625 with a total municipal population of 2187 of which 71.7% were Croats, 9.1% were Italians and 6.2% declared themselves as Istrians. Like most settlements in Istrian interior Višnjan is experiencing depopulation in the last decades as people are migrating towards the coast.

According to the 1921 census the majority of the population was italian.

History

In the village of Strpačići, 1 km from Višnjan copper earrings and needles were found. Illyrians came to the region somewhere between 2000 and 1000 BC and were later replaced by Celts. The remains of the Celtic era can be found on the nearby Montemez hill which is Celtic for nice hill. Remnants of pottery can be found all over the area as well in the town itself. A few kilometers west from Višnjan there is a prehistoric  and medieval settlement called Dilian with a monastery and church named Saint Mihovil dating from the 11th century. Višnjan was first mentioned in a document from 1003 AD. Višnjan was surrounded by a defense wall until the 18th century. The City was entered through a gate crowned with a Venetian lion and an open book. Višnjan was part of the Motovun municipality until  1847 when it became an independent municipality. It was subsequently incorporated into Poreč municipality in 1947. In 1976 an astronomical observatory was built in Višnjan and the town became the astronomy centre of Yugoslavia. In 1993 Višnjan again became an independent municipality.

Economy

Most of Višnjan's economy comes from agriculture mostly olive growing and viticulture. Višnjan is also known as one of the last resorts in Istria of autochthon Istrian bovine Boškarin. Boškarin, the first geno-park in Croatia, was founded With the intention of preserving Boškarin in Višnjan . Most of the people work on the coast and travel daily to work.

Towns and villages in municipality

Anžići
Bačva
Barburdi
Barat
Barići
Baškoti
Benčani
Bokići
Broskvari
Bucalovići
Butori
Cerion

Cvitani
Deklion
Diklići
Fabci
Farini
Gambetići
Jugovci
Kočići
Kolombera
Korlevići
Košutići
Kurjavići

Legovići
Majkusi
Mališi
Markovac
Milanezi
Prašćari
Prhati
Pršurići
Radoši
Radovani
Rafael
Rapavel

Sinožići
Starići
Strpačići
Štuti
Sveti Ivan
Tičan
Trpari
Vrhljani
Zoričići
Ženodraga
Žikovići
Žužići

References

External links

 Višnjan official site
 Višnjan Observatory
 Webcam of Višnjan

Municipalities of Croatia
Populated places in Istria County
Italian-speaking territorial units in Croatia